Allport may refer to:

 Allport (surname)
 Allport, Arkansas, US

See also
 Alport (disambiguation)